Salem Presbyterian Church may refer to:

Beth Salem Presbyterian Church, Athens, Tennessee, listed on the National Register of Historic Places (NRHP)
 Salem Presbyterian Church (Limestone, Tennessee), NRHP-listed
 Salem Presbyterian Church (Washington College, Tennessee), NRHP-listed
 Salem Presbyterian Church (Salem, Virginia), NRHP-listed
Salem Presbyterian Parsonage, Salem, Virginia, NRHP-listed

See also
Salem Church (disambiguation)
 Salem Cemetery (disambiguation)